Zygiella dispar is a species of orb weaver in the family of spiders known as Araneidae.

In 2015, the genus Parazygiella was determined to be a taxonomic synonym of Zygiella, so Parazygiella dispar and the other species of Parazygiella were moved to the genus Zygiella.

References

Araneidae
Articles created by Qbugbot
Spiders described in 1885